Echinophyllia is a genus of large polyp stony corals. Members of this genus are colonial corals and are generally foliaceous, usually with very thin leaves. They are native to the Indo-Pacific and are sometimes found in reef aquariums.

Genera
The World Register of Marine Species lists the following species:

Echinophyllia aspera  (Ellis & Solander, 1786)
Echinophyllia bulbosa  Arrigoni, Benzoni & Berumen, 2016
Echinophyllia costata  Fenner & Veron, 2000
Echinophyllia echinata  (Saville-Kent, 1871)
Echinophyllia echinoporoides  Veron & Pichon, 1980
Echinophyllia galli  Benzoni & Arrigoni, 2016
Echinophyllia hirsuta  Nemenzo, 1979
Echinophyllia orpheensis  Veron & Pichon, 1980
Echinophyllia patula  (Hodgson & Ross, 1982)
Echinophyllia pectinata  Veron, 2000
†Echinophyllia sassellensis  Budd & Bosellini, 2016 
Echinophyllia tarae  Benzoni, 2013

References

Lobophylliidae
Scleractinia genera